Camp 10 was one of three main prisoner of war (POW) and internee camps, located at Loveday during World War II, in South Australia's Riverland, approximately 12 kilometres from Renmark. This camp could hold up to 1000 people and also held the camp headquarters and 39 buildings, including the hospital. The first Italian prisoner arrived at the camp on 12 August 1941. The camp guard was provided by members of 25/33 Garrison Battalion, a militia unit of the Australian Army.

This camp was also involved in greater world affairs during the Second World War. German nationals, who had been detained in Iran after the British and Soviet invasion were deported here. In retaliation, the Germans interned a number of British nationals from the Channel Islands and sent them to southern Germany.

See also 

 Ilag
 List of POW camps in Australia
 Loveday Camp 9
 Loveday Camp 14

External links 
 Segment from SA Life re the Loveday camps
 Details of Loveday Camp 10
 Australian National Archives factsheet about Loveday POW & Internee Camp, South Australia
 Loveday research project: Japanese civilians interned in Australia

Military camps in Australia
History of South Australia
World War II internment camps in Australia
World War II prisoner-of-war camps in Australia
Riverland